Eastern Counties 1 is an English level 9 Rugby Union League.  From the 2017-18 promoted teams move up to the newly created London 3 Eastern Counties with the league champions going up automatically, while relegated teams drop down to Eastern Counties 2 (split into three regional divisions - north, south, west). Teams in this league tend to be based in Cambridgeshire, Norfolk or Suffolk.  In the past teams from Essex used to take part until the 2003–04 season when they formed a new league - with Essex 1 being the top division.  Each year some of the 1st XV clubs in this division also take part in the RFU Junior Vase - a level 9-12 national competition.

The division was split across three geographic areas (North, South & West) for the 2017-18 as part of an RFU reorganization of the London & South East regional league. The top two teams from each Area Division shall enter the Championship Phase (Shield) to determine the final rankings for promotion to London 3 Eastern Counties. Other teams will play in the Plate, Bowl and Salver competitions, depending on league position, with clubs finishing bottom of the Salver being relegated to Eastern Counties 2.

Participating Clubs 2021-22

North
 Beccles
 Diss II 
 Lowestoft & Yarmouth
 North Walsham II 
 Norwich II 
 Southwold II
 Watton
 Wymondham II

South
Braintree II
Brightlingsea
Colchester III
Hadleigh
Mistley
Ipswich II
Stowmarket II
Sudbury II

West
Bury St Edmunds III
Cambridge III
Cantabrigian II
Cottenham Renegades
Haverhill and District
 Mildenhall & Red Lodge
Shelford III

Season 2020–21

On 30 October the RFU announced  that a decision had been taken to cancel Adult Competitive Leagues (National League 1 and below) for the 2020/21 season meaning Eastern Counties 1 was not contested.

Participating Clubs 2019-20

North
 Diss II 
 Holt
 North Walsham II 
 Norwich II 
 Norwich Medics 
 Norwich Union
 Watton
 Wymondham II

South
Braintree II
Colchester III
Hadleigh
Halstead Templars
Mersea Island
Ipswich II
Stowmarket II
Sudbury II

West
Bury St Edmunds III
Cambridge III
Cantabrigian II
Cottenham Renegades
Newmarket
Saffron Walden II
Shelford III

Participating Clubs 2018-19

North
 Beccles 
 Diss II 
 Lowestoft & Yarmouth 
 North Walsham II 
 Norwich II 
 Norwich Medics 
 Norwich Union
 Wymondham II

South
Brightlingsea
Bury St Edmunds III
Colchester III
Hadleigh
Halstead Templars
Harwich & Dovercourt II
Ipswich II
Sudbury II

West
Cambridge III
Cantabrigian II
Cottenham Renegades
Ely II
March Bears
Newmarket
Saffron Walden II
Shelford III

Participating Clubs 2017-18 
 Beccles (North)
 Brightlingsea (South)
 Bury St. Edmunds III (West)
 Cambridge Adventurers (West)
 Cantabrigian II (West)
 Colchester III (South)
 Cottenham Renegades (West)
 Diss II (North)
 Fakenham (North)
 Great Yarmouth-Broadland (North)
 Hadleigh (South)
 Haverhill & District (West)
 Ipswich Magpies (South)
 Ipswich Y.M. (South)
 Mistley (South)
 North Walsham II (North)
 Norwich Medics (North)
 Norwich Union (North)
 Saffron Walden II (West)
 Shelford III (West)
 Stowmarket II (South)
 Sudbury Talbots (South)
 Swaffham (North)
 Thurston (West)

Participating Clubs 2016-17
Beccles (relegated from London 3 North East)
Bury St Edmunds 3rd XV
Colchester III
Crusaders
Ipswich Y.M.
Newmarket
Thetford
Thurston
Wisbech
Woodbridge
Wymondham

Participating Clubs 2015-16
Crusaders
Ely
Ipswich Y.M.
Mersea Island
Newmarket
Swaffham
Thetford
Thurston
Wisbech
Woodbridge 
Wymondham

Participating Clubs 2014-15
Crusaders
Ely
Ipswich Y.M.
Mersea Island
Newmarket
Southwold
Swaffham
Thetford (promoted from Eastern Counties 2)
Thurston (promoted from Eastern Counties 2)
Wisbech (relegated from London 3 North East)
Woodbridge
Wymondham (relegated from London 3 North East)

Participating Clubs 2013-14
Broadland - Great Yarmouth (promoted from Eastern Counties 2)
Crusaders
Ely
Harwich & Dovercourt
Ipswich Y.M.	 	 
Mersea Island
Newmarket
Swaffham (promoted from Eastern Counties 2)	 	 
West Norfolk	 	 
Woodbridge

Participating Clubs 2012-13
Crusaders
Ely
Hadleigh
Harwich & Dovercourt
Ipswich Y.M.
Mersea Island
Newmarket
Southwold
Thurston
West Norfolk
Woodbridge
Wymondham

Original teams
When league rugby began in 1987 this division contained the following teams:

Cambridge
Crusaders
Ely
Harlow
Lowestoft & Yarmouth
Met Police Chigwell
Redbridge
Rochford Hundred
Romford & Gidea Park
Shelford
Thetford

Eastern Counties 1 honours

Eastern Counties 1 (1987–1993)

The original Eastern Counties 1 was a tier 8 league with promotion up to London 3 North East and relegation down to Eastern Counties 2.

Eastern Counties 1 (1993–1996)

The creation of National 5 South meant that Eastern Counties 1 dropped from a tier 8 league to a tier 9 league for the years that National 5 South was active.  Promotion and relegation continued to London 3 North East and Eastern Counties 2 respectively.

Eastern Counties 1 (1996–2000)

The cancellation of National 5 South at the end of the 1995–96 season meant that Eastern Counties 1 reverted to being a tier 8 league.  Promotion and relegation continued to London 3 North East and Eastern Counties 2 respectively.

Eastern Counties 1 (2000–2009)

The introduction of London 4 North East ahead of the 2000–01 season meant Eastern Counties 1 dropped to become a tier 9 league with promotion to this new division.  Relegation continued to Eastern Counties 2 - split into north and south regional divisions between 2000 and 2003.

Eastern Counties 1 (2009–2017)

Eastern Counties 1 remained a tier 9 league despite national restructuring by the RFU.  Promotion was to London 3 North East (formerly London 4 North East) and relegation to Eastern Counties 2, which split into three regional divisions - north, south, west - from the 2014–15 season onward.

Eastern Counties 1 (2017–present)

The cancellation of London 3 North East and subsequent introduction of London 3 Eastern Counties ahead of the 2017–18 meant that Eastern Counties 1 remained a tier 9 league with promotion to this new division.  Relegation continued to the regionalised Eastern Counties 2 (north, south, west).

Promotion play-offs
Between 2004 and 2017 there was a play-off between the runners-up of Eastern Counties 1 and Essex 1 for the third and final promotion place to London 3 North East. The team with the superior league record had home advantage in the tie.  At the end of the 2016–17 season the Essex 1 teams had been the most successful with seven wins to the Eastern Counties 1 teams five; and the home team has won promotion on eight occasions compared to the away teams four.  Since the introduction of London 3 Eastern Counties and London 3 Essex at the end of the 2016–17 season the playoff has been cancelled.

Number of league titles

Thetford (3)
Beccles (2)
Lowestoft & Yarmouth (2)
Mersea Island (2)
Wymondham (2)
Basildon (1)
Bury St Edmunds (1)
Cantabrigian (1)
Canvey Island (1)
Chelmsford (1)
Colchester (1)
Diss (1)
Ely (1)
Eton Manor (1)
Fakenham (1)
Hadleigh (1)
Harlow (1)
Maldon (1)
Met Police Chigwell (1)
Newmarket (1)
Rochford Hundred (1)
Saffron Walden (1)
Southwold (1)
Stowmarket (1)
West Norfolk (1)
Wisbech (1)

See also
London & SE Division RFU
Eastern Counties RU
Essex RFU
English rugby union system
Rugby union in England

Notes

References

9
Rugby union in Essex
Rugby union in Cambridgeshire
Rugby union in Norfolk
Rugby union in Suffolk